Andrés Alberto Andrade Cedeño (born 16 October 1998) is a Panamanian professional footballer who plays as a defender for German  club Arminia Bielefeld and the Panama national team.

Club career
On 31 August 2021, the last day of the 2021 summer transfer window, Andrade joined Bundesliga club Arminia Bielefeld on loan for the 2021–22 season from Austrian Bundesliga side LASK.  Arminia Bielefeld secured an option to sign him permanently which they did in June 2022.

International career
Andrade represented the Panama U20 national team at the 2017 CONCACAF U-20 Championship, scoring once.

On 16 November 2018, Andrade made his debut for the senior Panama national team against Honduras as a 72nd-minute substitute for Erick Davis.

International goals

Scores and results list Panama's goal tally first, score column indicates score after each Andrade goal.

Honours
Individual
CONCACAF U-20 Championship Best XI: 2017

References

External links

1998 births
Sportspeople from Panama City
Living people
Panamanian footballers
Association football defenders
Panama international footballers
Panama youth international footballers
Panama under-20 international footballers
Liga Panameña de Fútbol players
Austrian Football Bundesliga players
2. Liga (Austria) players
Bundesliga players
2. Bundesliga players
San Francisco F.C. players
FC Juniors OÖ players
LASK players
Arminia Bielefeld players
Panamanian expatriate footballers
Panamanian expatriate sportspeople in Mexico
Expatriate footballers in Mexico
Panamanian expatriate sportspeople in Austria
Expatriate footballers in Austria
Panamanian expatriate sportspeople in Germany
Expatriate footballers in Germany